Melville Price (1920–1970) was an American painter and educator.

Life
Price was born in 1920 in New York City.

Price experimented with Surrealism and Cubism before embracing Abstract Expressionism. He first taught art in Pennsylvania, including summer classes at Penn State Abington. He later became a professor of art at the University of Alabama.

Price died in 1970 in Tuscaloosa, Alabama. For art critic Sarah Lansdell, "Price was not a compromiser and his works are deliberately harsh."

Further reading

References

1920 births
1970 deaths
Painters from New York City
People from Tuscaloosa, Alabama
Abstract expressionist artists
American male painters
Painters from Alabama
University of Alabama faculty
20th-century American painters
20th-century American male artists